Syneta ferruginea, the rusty leaf beetle, is a species of leaf beetle. It is found in eastern North America.

References

Further reading

 
 
 

Synetinae
Beetles described in 1811
Taxa named by Ernst Friedrich Germar